The Guangdong Provincial People's Stadium is a multi-purpose stadium in Guangzhou, China.  It is currently used mostly for football matches. The stadium holds 15,000 people. The stadium is best reached by taking Guangzhou Metro Line 1 to Martyrs' Park Station.

History 
Formerly known as the dongjiaochang or Eastern Parade Ground, the site was first used as a sporting venue in 1906 when it hosted Guangdong's (and China's) first ever provincial level athletics competition. Sun Yat-Sen ordered the construction of a stadium on the site in 1922 but it wasn't finished until 1932.

It was used as a Japanese transport and supplies depot during the occupation of Guangzhou and was bombed when Guangzhou was liberated.

Construction of Yuexiushan meant that the People's Stadium didn't hold many high-profile sporting or civic events from the mid 1950s onwards. However, it did host many games in the Guangdong-Hong Kong Cup as well as games in the inaugural Women's World Cup in 1991.

Recent use 
For the 2017 Chinese Super League Season, Guangzhou R&F F.C. used the stadium as their temporary home for their first two matches whilst Yuexiushan was being refurbished.

References

External links 
 Guangdong Provincial People's Stadium at Sports.qq.com

Athletics (track and field) venues in China
1991 FIFA Women's World Cup stadiums
Football venues in Guangzhou
Multi-purpose stadiums in China
Sports venues completed in 1932
Sports venues in Guangzhou
Venues of the 2010 Asian Games
Yuexiu District